The 2016–17 season of the Frauen-Bundesliga was the 27th season of Germany's premier women's football league. Bayern Munich were the defending champions.

VfL Wolfsburg secured their third title.

Teams
MSV Duisburg was promoted from the 2015–16 2. Bundesliga north and Borussia Mönchengladbach from the south.

League table

Results

Topscorers

Hat-tricks

References

External links
Weltfussball.de
DFB.de

2016-17
1